The 2022 PDC World Darts Championship (officially referred to as the 2021/22 William Hill World Darts Championship) was the 29th World Championship organised by the Professional Darts Corporation since it separated from the now-defunct British Darts Organisation. It took place at the Alexandra Palace in London from 15 December 2021 to 3 January 2022.

Gerwyn Price was the defending champion, after he defeated Gary Anderson 7–3 to claim his first World Championship in 2021. However, he lost 5–4 to Michael Smith in the quarter-finals. For the first time since 2006, no players from outside the United Kingdom reached the quarter-final stage.

Three nine-dart finishes were made in the tournament, the most in a single PDC World Championship. William Borland became the first ever player in a televised tournament to hit a nine-dart finish in a deciding leg, against Bradley Brooks in the first round. Darius Labanauskas then hit the second of the tournament the following day, in his first-round match against Mike De Decker. Price hit his first televised nine-dart finish, and the third of the tournament, against Michael Smith in the quarter-finals.

Three players were forced to withdraw in the third round due to testing positive for COVID-19; on 27 December, Vincent van der Voort was forced to withdraw from the tournament ahead of his match against James Wade, three-time World Champion Michael van Gerwen withdrew the following day from his match against Chris Dobey, and Dave Chisnall withdrew on 29 December before his match against Luke Humphries.

Peter Wright won the World Championship for the second time in his career, defeating Michael Smith 7–5 in the final.

The event would be the final event of William Hill's sponsorship deal with the PDC, as the organisation had announced on 18 July 2021 that it had reached a multi-year, multi-tournament sponsorship deal with British car sales company Cazoo for all of its events from 2022 and onwards, including the World Championship.

Format
All matches were played as single in, double out; requiring the players to score 501 points to win a leg, finishing on either a double or the bullseye. Matches were played to set format, with each set being the best of five legs (first to three). After a one-year break, the tie-break rule came back into force. For all rounds except the first, the final set had to be won by two clear legs, unless the set score went to 5–5, in which case a sudden-death leg was played. This year, there was no throw for the bull in any sudden-death legs.

The matches got longer as the tournament progressed:

Prize money
The prize money for the tournament was £2,500,000 in total – the same as the previous year. The winner's share was £500,000.

Qualification

Qualifiers
The top 32 from the PDC Order of Merit began the competition in the second round. The 32 highest ranked players on the PDC Pro Tour Order of Merit (not already qualified) and 32 qualifiers from around the world began in the first round.

Order of Merit Second round (seeded)

  Gerwyn Price (quarter-finals)
  Peter Wright (champion)
  Michael van Gerwen (third round, COVID-19)
  James Wade (semi-finals)
  Dimitri Van den Bergh (second round)
  Gary Anderson (semi-finals)
  José de Sousa (third round)
  Jonny Clayton (fourth round)
  Michael Smith (runner-up)
  Nathan Aspinall (third round)
  Rob Cross (fourth round)
  Krzysztof Ratajski (second round)
  Joe Cullen (third round)
  Dave Chisnall (third round, COVID-19)
  Ryan Searle (fourth round)
  Stephen Bunting (second round)
  Dirk van Duijvenbode (fourth round)
  Danny Noppert (third round)
  Luke Humphries (quarter-finals)
  Simon Whitlock (second round)
  Mervyn King (quarter-finals)
  Daryl Gurney (third round)
  Brendan Dolan (second round)
  Glen Durrant (second round)
  Gabriel Clemens (third round)
  Mensur Suljović (second round)
  Ian White (third round)
  Devon Petersen (second round)
 
  Chris Dobey (fourth round)
  Damon Heta (third round)
  Kim Huybrechts (third round)

Pro Tour Order of MeritFirst round
  Callan Rydz (quarter-finals)
  Ross Smith (third round)
 
  Ryan Joyce (second round)
  Adrian Lewis (second round)
  Scott Mitchell (first round)
  Alan Soutar (fourth round)
  Martijn Kleermaker (fourth round)
  Darius Labanauskas (first round)
  Ritchie Edhouse (second round)
  Luke Woodhouse (second round)
  Jamie Hughes (first round)
  Maik Kuivenhoven (second round)
  Rowby-John Rodriguez (second round)
  Steve Beaton (second round)
  William O'Connor (third round)
  Ricky Evans (second round)
  Keane Barry (second round)
  Jason Heaver (second round)
  William Borland (second round)
  Ron Meulenkamp (second round)
  Steve Lennon (third round)
  Rusty-Jake Rodriguez (second round)
  Lewy Williams (second round)
  Florian Hempel (third round)
  Jermaine Wattimena (first round)
  Joe Murnan (second round)
  Ryan Meikle (second round)
  Chas Barstow (second round)
  Ted Evetts (first round)
  Adam Hunt (second round)
  Jason Lowe (second round)

International QualifiersFirst round
  Lisa Ashton – Women's Series OoM runner-up (first round)
  Roman Benecký – East Europe Qualifier (first round)
  Bradley Brooks – PDC UK Development Tour (first round)
  Matt Campbell – PDC Europe Challenge Tour (first round)
  Lourence Ilagan – PDC Asia Philippines Qualifier  (first round)
  Nick Kenny – PDPA Qualifier (first round)
  Boris Koltsov – EADC Qualifier (second round)
  Boris Krčmar – PDPA Qualifier (first round)
  Nitin Kumar – Indian Qualifier (first round)
  Royden Lam – PDC Asia Hong Kong Qualifier (first round)
  Chris Landman – West Europe Qualifier (second round)
  Daniel Larsson – PDCNB Order of Merit (first round)
  Danny Lauby – CDC USA Tour (first round)
  Paul Lim – PDC Asia Singapore Qualifier (first round)
  Charles Losper – African Qualifier (withdrew)
  John Michael – South-East Europe Qualifier (first round)
  John Norman Jnr – CDC Canada Tour (first round)
  Diogo Portela – Central/South America Qualifier (first round)
  Madars Razma – PDCNB Order of Merit (first round)
  Ben Robb – DPNZ Qualifier (first round)
   Juan Rodriguez – South-West Europe Qualifier (COVID-19) 
  Martin Schindler – PDC Europe Super League (first round)
 
  Fallon Sherrock – Women's Series OoM leader (first round)
  Toyokazu Shibata – PDC Asia Japan Qualifier (first round)
  Jeff Smith – CDC Continental Cup (first round)
  Ky Smith – Oceanic Masters Winner (first round)
  Raymond Smith – DPA Qualifier (fourth round)
  Lihao Wen – PDC China Champion (withdrew)
  Jim Williams – PDC UK Challenge Tour (second round)
  James Wilson – PDPA Qualifier (first round)
  Yuki Yamada – PDJ Qualifier (first round)
  Mike De Decker – Replacement (second round)
  Gordon Mathers – Replacement (first round)
  Peter Hudson – Replacement (first round)

Seeds
2021 winner Gerwyn Price, who since winning has also won the 2021 Grand Slam of Darts, was top of the two-year PDC Order of Merit and number one seed going into the tournament. 2020 winner Peter Wright, the winner of the 2021 World Matchplay and part of the victorious Scotland team at the 2021 PDC World Cup of Darts, was second seed and Michael van Gerwen, the three-time World Champion from 2014, 2017 and 2019, was third seed. As well as Price, Wright and Van Gerwen, two other previous PDC world champions qualified as seeds; 2015 and 2016 World Champion and 2021 runner-up Gary Anderson was 6th seeded, and 2018 World Champion and 2021 European Champion Rob Cross was the 11th seed. Two former champions of the BDO World Darts Championship qualified as seeds; three-time BDO champion Glen Durrant was the 24th seed with 2014 BDO champion Stephen Bunting in 16th.

The top seeds behind Price, Wright and Van Gerwen were 2021 UK Open champion James Wade, 2020 World Matchplay winner Dimitri Van den Bergh, Anderson, 2020 Grand Slam of Darts winner José de Sousa, and 2021 Masters, Premier League, World Series Finals and World Grand Prix champion Jonny Clayton.

Pro Tour qualification
Callan Rydz, a two-time event winner on the 2021 PDC Pro Tour, was the highest-ranked non-seed on the 2021 PDC Pro Tour Order of Merit. 2007 World Champion Raymond van Barneveld returned as a Pro Tour qualifier, having announced his retirement following a first-round exit in 2020, and then reversed his decision after a year out. Van Barneveld was one of two former PDC World Champions to qualify via the Pro Tour, with 2011 and 2012 winner Adrian Lewis also qualifying. The highest-ranked debutant via the Pro Tour was Scott Mitchell, the 2015 BDO World Champion. As well as Mitchell and four-time BDO World Champion Van Barneveld, 1996 BDO champion Steve Beaton also qualified via the Pro Tour, making a record 31st consecutive World Championship appearance.

As well as Mitchell, other players qualifying for their PDC World Championship debuts were Alan Soutar, Jason Heaver, William Borland, Rusty-Jake Rodriguez, Lewy Williams, Florian Hempel and Chas Barstow. Martijn Kleermaker also appeared for the first time, having withdrawn from the 2021 tournament following a positive COVID-19 test. Other players qualifying via the Pro Tour included the 2021 World Youth Champion Ted Evetts and 2021 PDC World Cup of Darts finalist Rowby-John Rodriguez, who along with his brother Rusty-Jake became the fourth pair of siblings to compete in the same World Championship.

Unranked qualifiers
The final group of 32 qualifiers were determined by a series of international qualifiers and secondary tours. The PDC Development and Challenge Tours were split into UK and EU sections this year, meaning that an extra qualification spot was available via the Challenge Tour. The PDC Asian Tour was not held for a second consecutive year, with one-off qualification tournaments being held to replace it. The two Australian qualification spots were taken by Raymond Smith and Ky Smith, the first father-and-son to play in the same PDC World Darts Championship. Paul Lim qualified via the Singapore qualifier, becoming at age 67 and 326 days the oldest player to compete in the World Championship; while Fabian Schmutzler, who qualified via the Development Tour, was the second-youngest player ever to compete in the World Championship.

Four-time BDO Women's World Champion Lisa Ashton qualified via the PDC Women's Tour, alongside Fallon Sherrock, the 2021 Grand Slam of Darts quarter-finalist and only woman to have previously won a match at the PDC World Darts Championship. The final three places were awarded to the winners of a qualification tournament for PDPA members, with the winners being Nick Kenny, Boris Krčmar and James Wilson.

Three of the international qualifiers withdrew following the draw; Charles Losper and Lihao Wen, due to visa issues, and potential debutant Juan Rodriguez, following a positive test for COVID-19. They were replaced by runners-up from the PDPA qualifier in Order of Merit order, Mike De Decker, Gordon Mathers and Peter Hudson.

Debutants via the international and invitation qualifiers were Roman Benecký, Chris Landman, John Norman Jnr, Fabian Schmutzler, Toyokazu Shibata, Ky Smith and Jim Williams.

Summary

Opening rounds 
The first round of the tournament, running from 15 to 21 December, saw the 32 qualifiers from the PDC Pro Tour take on 32 players from international qualifiers. Two players hit nine-dart finishes in consecutive days, William Borland hitting one against Bradley Brooks in the final leg of his debut on 17 December, becoming the first player to hit a nine-darter in a sudden death leg to win a televised match; before Darius Labanauskas hit a second nine-darter in his defeat to Mike De Decker. Another high-profile match saw Fallon Sherrock take on Steve Beaton, with Beaton defeating the "Queen of the Palace" 3–2.

The second round, starting the same day as the first and running through to 23 December, saw the 32 seeds enter the tournament to take on first round winners. Two matches turned out to be between two former World Champions, with Rob Cross defeating Raymond van Barneveld and Gary Anderson eliminating Adrian Lewis in an early-round repeat of the 2011 and 2016 finals. Eight seeds were eliminated in the second round, the highest ranked of these being Dimitri Van den Bergh, the fifth seed, defeated by debutant Florian Hempel.

Prior to the third round, three players had to withdraw after testing positive for COVID-19, those being Vincent van der Voort, Michael van Gerwen and Dave Chisnall, with their scheduled third round opponents receiving byes. After the withdrawal of former champion Van Gerwen, reigning champion Gerwyn Price said that the tournament was devalued, and called for the tournament to be postponed. Van Gerwen himself criticised the PDC for a lack of COVID checks on supporters, calling the tournament a "big corona bomb". Former PDC chairman Barry Hearn responded to these comments made, declaring calls for a postponement "ignorant", and said all fans had been confirmed to be double-vaccinated.

In the third round, running from 27 to 29 December, Price came through a last-leg tie-break against Kim Huybrechts, while Dirk van Duijvenbode fought back from 3–0 down to knock out Ross Smith 4–3. Former champion Gary Anderson did the same against Ian White, but Joe Cullen's attempt at a similar feat against Martijn Kleermaker faltered as he lost the final set. The last remaining international qualifier Raymond Smith ended Florian Hempel's run with a 4–1 win, while former champions Peter Wright and Rob Cross both safely qualified.

The fourth round, from 29 to 30 December, saw Price knock out van Duijvenbode in a match which saw chants of "sheep shagging bastard" directed at Price, which Welsh rugby former international Andy Powell and social media users branded as racist. Michael Smith eliminated Jonny Clayton in a 4–3 thriller. Raymond Smith's run was ended by Mervyn King, with King winning nine of the last ten legs to reverse a 3–1 deficit into a 4–3 victory. There was also 4–3 victories for Luke Humphries over Chris Dobey, both of whom had come through the third round via byes, and for Anderson over Cross in a clash of former World Champions. James Wade, another beneficiary of a bye, defeated Martijn Kleermaker 4–0, while Callan Rydz and Peter Wright defeated Alan Soutar and Ryan Searle respectively, both by a score of 4–1.

Final stages 
The quarter-finals were held on New Year's Day. Wade comfortably beat Mervyn King 5–0 to reach his fourth World Championship semi-final. The match between Anderson and Humphries saw the first four sets being shared between the two players, before Anderson took control and won the last three sets to triumph 5–2, reaching his seventh semi-final (second consecutively), and condemning Humphries to a third quarter-final exit in four years. Rydz held leads of 2–0, 3–1 and 4–3 over Wright, before Wright levelled and took the final set in extra legs to eliminate his unseeded opponent and reach his fourth semi-final. Finally, the match between Smith and Price saw the first eight sets go with throw; with Price both hitting the tournament's third nine-dart finish and missing two darts to break the eighth set and win the match; before Smith broke throw in the final set to reach his second semi-final.

The semi-finals were held on 2 January. In the first game Smith led from the start, winning the first set and then breaking Wade's throw to take the second set. Wade broke back in the third set before Smith restored the two-set advantage by breaking again in the fourth. Smith took sets five and six to go one away, and despite Wade taking the next two sets, he was not able to prevent Smith from triumphing, condemning Wade to a fourth semi-final defeat from four attempts and enabling Smith to reach his second World Championship final. In the second semi-final, Wright took the first three sets – two of them against throw – before Anderson broke back in the fourth set and then held in the fifth to close the gap to one. Wright stopped the comeback by holding throw in the sixth set, and from then on a high-quality match went with throw, with Wright breaking Anderson's record - set in the 2017 final - for most 180s in a World Championship match, with 24, and taking the win 6–4 to reach his third World Championship final.

In the final, held on 3 January, Peter Wright began the game in control of throw and took the first set 3–1, before breaking with a 148 checkout in the second set on his way to another 3–1 win. Smith closed the deficit with a 3–1 win in the third set, including a 167 checkout to break; and took the fourth set 3–2 after Wright missed two darts to break. Wright held the fifth set 3–2, and Smith took the sixth 3–1. The seventh set saw Smith take the lead in sets for the first time, and the first 3–0 win of a set, with Smith breaking the Wright throw twice. Wright however broke back in the eighth set 3–1. Smith took advantage of missed darts from Wright to win the ninth set 3–2 and regain the lead; but after going 2 legs up in the tenth set, he allowed Wright to come back and take the set to level again. Wright took the lead after winning the eleventh set 3–0 to move one away from the title; and took the next two legs in the twelfth set, and after Smith pulled one back, Wright sealed the title with a thirteen-dart hold, hitting double 16 to win his second World Championship.

Schedule

Draw

Final

Finals

Top half

Section 1

Section 2

Bottom half

Section 3

Section 4

Top averages
This table shows the highest averages achieved by players throughout the tournament.

Representation
This table shows the number of players by country in the tournament. Originally, a total of 31 nationalities were to be represented, which would surpass the record of the 2021 edition by two. However, after late withdrawals, the total number of nationalities represented dropped to 29 - equalling the maximum of 2021.

Broadcasting rights

Television

Radio

Radio coverage in the UK was provided by Talksport 2, with commentary from Ian Danter, Mark Wilson, Chris Murphy, Rob Mullarkey, Paul Nicholson and Chris Mason.

References

2022
World Championship
World Championship
2021 in British sport
2022 in British sport
2021 sports events in London
2022 sports events in London
International sports competitions in London
Alexandra Palace
December 2021 sports events in the United Kingdom
January 2022 sports events in the United Kingdom